Cadac may refer to:

Companies
 Cadac Group, a software and information technology company
 Cadac Electronics, a manufacturer of sound mixing desks
 Cadac (South Africa), a manufacturer of gas and outdoor equipment

People with the name
 Cadac-Andreas, an Irish scholar